is a railway station on the Kagoshima Main Line, operated by JR Kyushu in Kita-ku, Kumamoto, Japan.

Lines 

Layout 
The station consists of a side and an island platform serving three tracks at grade with two sidings branching off track 1. The station building is a simple, functional, concrete structure which serves to house a waiting room and automatic ticket vending machines. Access to the island platform is by means of a footbridge.

Adjacent stations

History
In the next phase of expansion, the track was extended south with  opening as the new southern terminus on 1 July 1891. On the same day, Ueki was opened as an intermediate station along the new track. When the Kyushu Railway was nationalized on 1 July 1907, Japanese Government Railways (JGR) took over control of the station. On 12 October 1909, the station became part of the Hitoyoshi Main Line and then on 21 November 1909, part of the Kagoshima Main Line. With the privatization of Japanese National Railways (JNR), the successor of JGR, on 1 April 1987, JR Kyushu took over control of the station.

The station was earlier on equipped with a staffed ticket window but became unstaffed in 2015.

Passenger statistics
In fiscal 2016, the station was used by an average of 708 passengers daily (boarding passengers only), and it ranked 203rd among the busiest stations of JR Kyushu.

References

External links
Ueki (JR Kyushu)

Railway stations in Kumamoto Prefecture
Railway stations in Japan opened in 1891